The Tera is a river in the north of Spain, a tributary of the River Esla.

It is of ecological importance, being the home of 24 species of the European Union Nature Directives. Riberas del Río Tera y afluentes was designated a Special Area of Conservation in 2015.

References

External links 

Rivers of Spain
Tributaries of the Esla